WPDM (1470 AM) is a radio station broadcasting a country music format. Licensed to Potsdam, New York, United States.  The station is owned by Martz Communications Group, through licensee Waters Communications Inc.

History
On May 18, 2015, WPDM changed formats from sports to classic country, branded as "Star 100.1".

On September 20, 2021, WPDM changed formats from classic country to country, branded as "Wild Country".

FM translator

Previous logo

References

External links

PDM
Country radio stations in the United States